Rugby League World Cup records have been accumulating since the first Rugby League World Cup tournament was held in 1954.

Team Records

All-time record 

 Tournaments between 1954–1992 did not feature semi-final and quarter-final rounds.

Title win rate

Biggest wins

Individual records

Most appearances

Top try scorers

Top points scorers

Most tries in a tournament

Most tries in a match

Miscellaneous

Winning captains and coaches 
A foreign coach has never managed a World Cup-winning team.

Draws 

* After Extra Time

Nil points

Attendance Records
The 2013 Rugby League World Cup Final at the Old Trafford stadium in Manchester, England, drew a world record international rugby league attendance of 74,468.

Top 5 match attendances

Top 5 World Cup Final attendances

Highest Attendance per Host Nation

See also

References

External links

Records
World Cup records
Rugby league-related lists